Cartwrightia cartwrighti is a species of aphodiine scarab found in South America. Oscar L. Cartwright named the species in 1967 after his brother. C. cartwrighti has been recorded in cow dung in pastures and forests.

Description
The anterior pronotal ridges are narrow and sharply carinate. There are smooth black intervals on the elytra, but otherwise there is a grayish-brown clay-like covering, including on the underside.

Taxonomic history and etymology
The American entomologist Oscar L. Cartwright wrote the species description for C. cartwrighti in 1967. He placed it in the genus Cartwrightia which the Mexican entomologist Federico Islas Salas had named after him nine years earlier. Cartwright used three specimens to write his description: a male holotype and two female paratypes. All three specimens were collected with a blacklight insect trap in early January 1960.

Cartwright named this species after his brother Raymond Kenneth Cartwright. He was not an entomologist but accompanied Cartwright on several of his collecting expeditions. Cartwright's colleague at the National Museum of Natural History Paul J. Spangler wrote Cartwright named this species "with tongue and cheek and the usual twinkle in his eye" and that this name led him to be "subjected to considerable kidding". Elsie Herbold Froeschner's illustration of C. cartwrighti which accompanied Cartwright's original description was used as a logo for the invitation to Cartwright's retirement party; there he was gifted a set of stationery which was decorated with the same image.

The name Cartwrightia cartwrighti  is the only scientific name where the genus, species, and author names form a sequence using successive subtraction of the last letter to form the next word.

Distribution and Biology
C. cartwrighti is found in tropical South America. This is at the edge of the Amazon basin near the Gran Chaco. The studies in Presidencia de la Plaza and San Ramón found C. cartwrighti in cow dung, but only in forests but not in nearby pastures, while the study in Paraná found  specimens only in pastures but not in nearby forests.

Notes

References

Scarabaeidae
Beetles of South America
Beetles described in 1967